The 1992 Florida State Seminoles football team represented Florida State University in the 1992 NCAA Division I-A football season. The team was coached by Bobby Bowden and played their home games at Doak Campbell Stadium. The team was selected national champion by Sagarin.

Florida State finished #2 in the AP and Coaches polls with an 11–1 record. The season was FSU's first in the Atlantic Coast Conference, and saw them win the league championship with an undefeated record in conference play. The Seminoles offense scored 446 points while the defense allowed 186 points.

Linebacker Marvin Jones finished in fourth place in the Heisman voting while quarterback Charlie Ward finished sixth.

Schedule

Roster

Season summary

Miami (FL)

Florida

vs. Nebraska (Orange Bowl)

Awards and honors
Marvin Jones, Butkus Award
Marvin Jones, Lombardi Award

Team players in the NFL
The following were selected in the 1993 NFL Draft.

References

Florida State
Florida State Seminoles football seasons
Atlantic Coast Conference football champion seasons
Orange Bowl champion seasons
Florida State Seminoles football